This is a list of museums in Catalonia by comarca.

Alt Camp

Alcover 
 Museu d'Alcover

Valls 
 Museu de Valls
 Món Casteller Human Tower Museum of Catalonia (MCC)

Alt Empordà

Cadaqués 
 Museu de Cadaqués
 Salvador Dalí House - Portlligat Museum

Capmany 
 Museu de les Aixetes

Castelló d'Empúries 
 Flour Mill and Eco-Museum, Castelló d'Empúries
  Museu Parroquial "Tresor de la Catedral"
 Museu d’Història Medieval de la Cúria-Presó, s. XIV de Castelló d’Empúries (MHMCE)

L'Escala 
 Anchovy and Salt Museum
 Archaeology Museum of Catalonia - Empúries
 Museu de la Moto Col·lecció Vicenç Folgado

Figueres
 Dalí Theatre and Museum (Dalí·Jewels)
 Museu de l'Empordà
 Technical Museum of the Empordà
 Museu del Joguet de Catalunya (MJC)

La Jonquera 
 Exile Memorial Museum (MUME)

Llançà 
 Museu de l'Aquarel·la

Peralada 
 Museu del Castell de Peralada

Roses 
 Museu de la Ciutadella de Roses (MCR)

Torroella de Montgrí 
 The Museum of the Mediterranean

Alt Penedès

Olèrdola 
 Archaeology Museum of Catalonia - Olèrdola

Vilafranca del Penedès 
 Vinseum – Catalan Wine Cultures Museum

Alt Urgell

La Seu d'Urgell 
 Museu Diocesà d'Urgell

Alta Ribagorça
No registered museums

Anoia

Capellades 
 Capellades Paper Mill Museum

Igualada 
 Igualada Leather Museum
 Igualada Muleteer's Museum

Aran

Vielha e Mijaran 
 Musèu dera Val d'Aran

Bages

Manresa 
 Museu Comarcal de Manresa

Monistrol de Montserrat 
 Museum of Montserrat

Baix Camp

Cambrils 
 Museu d'Història de Cambrils

Reus 
 Museu de Reus
 Gaudí Centre

Baix Ebre

Tortosa 
 Museu de Tortosa

Baix Empordà

La Bisbal d'Empordà 
 The Terracotta Ceramics Museum

Castell-Platja d'Aro 
 Doll Museum of Castell d'Aro

Palafrugell 
 The Cork Museum
 Can Mario Museum
 The Josep Pla Foundation

Palamós 
 The Fishing Museum

Palau-sator 
 Museu Rural de Palau Sator

Pals 
 Ca la Pruna - Culture Museum

La Pera 
 Gala Dalí Castle Púbol

Sant Feliu de Guíxols 
 Sant Feliu de Guíxols History Museum
 The Toy Museum

Santa Cristina d'Aro 
 El Gran Museu de la Màgia (col·lecció Xevi)

Torroella de Montgrí 
 The Museum of the Mediterranean
 Palau Solterra Museum

Ullastret 
 Archaeology Museum of Catalonia - Ullastret

Baix Llobregat

Cornellà de Llobregat 
 Mercader Palace Museum
 Museu Agbar de les Aigües
 Museu de Matemàtiques de Catalunya (MMACA)
 Masia Museu Serra

Esparreguera 
 Museu de la Colònia Sedó

Esplugues de Llobregat 
 Can Tinturé Museum
 Ceramic Museum “La Rajoleta”

Gavà 
 Gavà Museum and the Gavà Mines Archaeological Park
 Fundació Hervás Amezcua

Martorell 
 L’Enrajolada Santacana House-Museum
 Vicenç Ros Municipal Museum

Molins de Rei 
 Molins de Rei Municipal Museum

Pallejà 
 Masia Museu Municipal de Pallejà

El Prat de Llobregat 
 El Prat Museum

Sant Boi de Llobregat 
 Sant Boi de Llobregat Museum

Sant Climent de Llobregat 
 Museu d'eines del pagès

Sant Joan Despí 
 Jujol Centre – Can Negre

Viladecans 
 Ca n'Amat

Baix Penedès

El Vendrell 
 Vil·la Casals-Museu Pau Casals
 Fundació Apel·les Fenosa
 Museu Deu

Barcelonès

Badalona 
 Badalona Museum

Barcelona

L'Hospitalet de Llobregat 
 L'Hospitalet Museum
 Arranz-Bravo Foundation

Sant Adrià de Besòs 
 History of Immigration in Catalonia Museum
 Refugi antiaeri de la placeta Macià (RapM)

Santa Coloma de Gramenet 
 Balldovina Tower Museum

Berguedà

Berga 
 Museu Comarcal de Berga

Castellar de n'Hug 
 Museu del Ciment Asland (National Museum of Science and Industry of Catalonia)

Cercs 
 Cercs Mine Museum

Fígols 
 Centre d'interpretació Dinosaures Fumanya

Cerdanya

Llívia 
 Museu Municipal de Llívia (Esteve Pharmacy)

Conca de Barberà

L'Espluga de Francolí 
 Museu de la Vida Rural

Montblanc 
 Museu Comarcal de la Conca de Barberà (MCCB)

Garraf

Sitges 
 Cau Ferrat Museum
 Maricel Museum
 Can Llopis Romanticism Museum
 Museu d'Art Contemporani de Sitges

Vilanova i la Geltrú 
 Catalonia Railway Museum
 Biblioteca Museu Víctor Balaguer
 Can Papiol Romanticism Museum
 Museu de Curiositats Marineres Roig Toqués

Garrigues

La Floresta 
 Museu de la Pedra

La Granadella 
 Museu de l'Oli de Catalunya

Les Borges Blanques 
 Museu de Cal Pauet
 Museu Arqueològic de les Borges Blanques

Garrotxa

Olot 
 Museu Comarcal de la Garrotxa
 Museum of the Saints, Olot

Gironès

Amer 
 Historical Museum of the City of Girona

Cervià de Ter
 Collection Museum Raset

Salt
 Collection Museum of the Water

Girona
 Archaeology Museum of Catalonia (Girona)
 Arab Baths
 Archeological promenade along / on the medieval city walls 
 Centre Bonastruc ça Porta - Jewish Heritage Museum
 Cinema Museum
 Girona Cathedral - Cathedral Art Museum
 Girona Synagogue - Old synagogue
 Museu d'Art de Girona
 History Museum of the City of Girona
 Petit Museu de la Fantasia, Col·lecció Llorenç Deulofeu (Small Fantasy Museum, Llorenç Deulofeu Collection - an indoor miniature city and doll houses)
 Treasure Museum of the Cathedral of Girona

Maresme

Argentona 
 Argentona Water Jug Museum

El Masnou 
 El Masnou Municipal Nautical Museum

Premià de Mar 
 Premià de Mar Textile Printing Museum

Vilassar de Dalt 
 Cau del Cargol

Moianès

Montsià

Amposta 
 Museu de les Terres de l'Ebre

Noguera

Osona

Pallars Jussà

Pallars Sobirà

Pla d'Urgell

Pla de l'Estany

Banyoles 
 Museu Arqueològic Comarcal de Banyoles
 Darder Museum and Interpretation of space, both in Lake of Banyoles

Priorat

Ribera d'Ebre

Móra la Nova 
 Railway Interpretation Centre of Móra la Nova

Ripollès

Segarra

Segrià

Lleida 
 CaixaForum Lleida
 Centre d'Art la Panera
 Lleida Museum
 Petite Galerie

Selva

Arbúcies 
 Museu Etnològic del Montseny, la Gabella (MEMGA)

Breda
 Josep Aragay Museum

Cassà de la Selva
 Art Park

Sant Hilari Sacalm
 Collection Municipal Museum Guilleries

Santa Coloma de Farners
 Collection of the Museum Trias of Cookies

Sils
 Collection Salvador Claret Automobile

Tossa de Mar
 Collection of Mediterranean Lighthouse Interpretation
 Municipal Museum of Tossa (Work Chagall)
 Maritime Museum Collection - Can Garriga in Lloret de Mar

Solsonès

Solsona 
 Museu Diocesà i Comarcal de Solsona

Tarragonès

Tarragona 
 National Archaeological Museum of Tarragona
 Museu d'Art Modern de Tarragona

Terra Alta

Urgell

Tàrrega 
 Museu Comarcal de l'Urgell

Verdú 
 Museum of Toys and Automata

Vallès Occidental

Castellbisbal 
 Museu de la Pagesia
 Museu del Tractor d'Època

Cerdanyola del Vallès 
 Cerdanyola Art Museum
 Ca n'Oliver Iberian Settlement and Museum
 Cerdanyola Museum

Montcada i Reixac 
 Montcada Municipal Museum

Ripollet 
 Molí d'en Rata Heritage Interpretation Centre

Rubí 
 Rubí Municipal Museum

Sabadell 
 Sabadell Art Museum (MAS)
 Sabadell History Museum (MHS)
 Museu de l'Institut Català de Paleontologia Miquel Crusafont
 Museu d'Eines del Camp

Sant Cugat del Vallès 
 Sant Cugat Museum

Terrassa 
 National Museum of Science and Industry of Catalonia (mNACTEC)
 Terrassa Museum
 Textile Museum and Documentation Centre

Vallès Oriental

Granollers 
 Granollers Museum
 Granollers Museum of Natural Sciences

External links 

 List of registered museums in Catalonia
 Catalan museums search engine
 Visitmuseum

 
Museums
Catalonia